The Thailand national under-17 football team is the national team for the under-17 and 16 level, representing Thailand in international football competitions in the FIFA U-17 World Cup, AFC U-16 Championship and AFF U-16 Championship. It is controlled by the Football Association of Thailand.

Thailand is an AFC champion in 1998 and three-time AFF champion. Thailand has also managed to qualify for the FIFA U-17 World Cup in 1997 and 1999.

Results and fixtures

2022

Players

Current squad

Recent call-ups
The following players have also been called up to the Thailand squad within the last 12 months.

Previous squads

FIFA U-17 World Cup
 1997 FIFA U-17 World Championship squads
 1999 FIFA U-17 World Championship squads

 
AFC U-16 Championship
 2014 AFC U-16 Championship squads
 2016 AFC U-16 Championship squads
 2018 AFC U-16 Championship squads

Coaching staff

Current coaching staff

Head coaches

Competition record

FIFA U-17 World Cup

Note
* : Denotes draws including knockout matches decided on penalty kicks.

AFC U-17 Asian Cup

Note
1 : The under-17 national team played at the 1992 to 2006 editions.
* : Denotes draws including knockout matches decided on penalty kicks.

Note
1 : Thailand won by pk (3-2) after playing an extra time.

AFF U-16 Championship

Note
1 : The under-17 national team played at the 2005 to 2007 editions.
* : Denotes draws including knockout matches decided on penalty kicks.

Exhibition game

Note
* : Denotes draws including knockout matches decided on penalty kicks.

All-time record table 
An all-time record table of Thailand national under-17 football team in major competitions only including; FIFA U-17 World Cup and AFC U-16 Championship.

Honours
This is a list of honours for the Thailand national under-17 football team.

International titles
AFC U-16 Championship
Winners (1): 1998
Runner-up (1): 1996

Regional titles
AFF U-16 Championship
Winners (3): 2007, 2011, 2015
Runner-up (4): 2005, 2017, 2018, 2019
Third place (2): 2016, 2022

Minor titles
 Singapore Lion City Cup Championship
 Winners (2): 1982, 2008
 Coca-Cola U-16 Cups
 Winners (1): 1984
 Jockey Club International Youth Tournament
 Winners (1): 2017
 CFA Under-17 Mens International Football Tournament
 Winners (1): 2018

See also
 Thailand national football team
 Thailand national under-23 football team
 Thailand national under-21 football team
 Thailand national under-20 football team

References

External links
 Football Association of Thailand 
 Thai Football.com
 Thai football page of Fifa.com
 Thai football Blog

Asian national under-17 association football teams
u17